Mount Dolber is a prominent mountain,  high, with a large snow-free summit, located between Mount Rea and Mount Cooper in the Sarnoff Mountains, Ford Ranges, Marie Byrd Land. It was mapped by the United States Antarctic Service (1939–41) and by the United States Geological Survey from surveys and U.S. Navy air photos (1959–65). It was named by the Advisory Committee on Antarctic Names for Captain Sumner R. Dolber, United States Coast Guard, captain of the icebreaker Southwind in the Antarctic Peninsula Ship Group (1967–68) and the Ross Sea Ship Group (1968–69).

References 

Mountains of Marie Byrd Land